Clifford Whittingham Beers (March 30, 1876 – July 9, 1943) was the founder of the American mental hygiene movement.

Biography 
Beers was born in New Haven, Connecticut, to Ida and Robert Beers on March 30, 1876. He was one of five children, all of whom would suffer from psychological distress and would spend time in mental institutions, including Beers himself (see "Clifford W. Beers, Advocate for the Insane"). He graduated from the Sheffield Scientific School at Yale in 1897, where he was business manager of The Yale Record and a member of Berzelius.

In 1900 he was first confined to a private mental institution for depression and paranoia. He would later be confined to another private hospital as well as a state institution. During these periods he experienced and witnessed serious maltreatment at the hands of the staff.  His book A Mind That Found Itself (1908), an autobiographical account of his hospitalization and the abuses he suffered, was widely and favorably reviewed, became a bestseller, and is still in print.

Beers gained the support of the medical profession and others in the work to reform the treatment of the mentally ill. In 1908 Beers founded the  "Connecticut Society for Mental Hygiene", now named Mental Health Connecticut. In 1909 Beers founded the "National Committee for Mental Hygiene", now named "Mental Health America", in order to continue the reform for the treatment of the mentally ill.

He also started the Clifford Beers Clinic in New Haven in 1913, the first outpatient mental health clinic in the United States.

Beers became Honorary President of the World Federation for Mental Health.

Beers was a leader in the field until his retirement in 1939. He died in Providence, Rhode Island, on July 9, 1943.

The Extra Mile in Washington, D.C., selected Beers as one of its 37 honorees. The Extra Mile pays homage to Americans like Beers who set their own self-interest aside to help others and successfully brought positive social change to the United States.

References

Bibliography
Clifford Beers, A Mind That Found Itself, Pittsburgh and London: University of Pittsburgh Press, 1981  
Norman Dain, Clifford W. Beers, Advocate for the Insane, Pittsburgh: University of Pittsburgh Press, 1980

External links
 Clifford Beers Clinic
 The Clifford Beers Foundation
 
 
 Mental Health America (MHA)

1876 births
1943 deaths
American memoirists
Writers from New Haven, Connecticut
Yale School of Engineering & Applied Science alumni
Mental health activists